C. nivea may refer to:
 Coccidiphila nivea, a moth species found in the United Arab Emirates
 Cordula nivea, a synonym for Paphiopedilum niveum
 Cubalaskeya nivea, a sea snail species
 Cyrestis nivea, the straight-line map-wing, a butterfly species found in south-east Asia

See also 
 Nivea (disambiguation)